Svitino is a Russian village near Sofino/Sofyino in the Naro-Fominsky District.

Point of interest
Svitino is characterized by a small lake having a fauna with crucian carps and Chinese sleeper (known in Russian as Rotan and scientifically as Perccottus glenii) and it is surrounded by the local forest.

References

Cities and towns in Moscow Oblast